László Komódi (born 7 October 1970 in Hungary) is a Hungarian football player.

References 
EUFO
1997/98 Season in Israel League A
1998/99 Season in Israel League B
 UEFA Official Website
xtratime
Soccerbase

1970 births
Living people
Hungarian footballers
Budapest Honvéd FC players
MTK Budapest FC players
Dunaújváros FC players
Vasas SC players
Fehérvár FC players
Hapoel Kfar Saba F.C. players
Hapoel Ashkelon F.C. players
Expatriate footballers in Israel
Association football midfielders